The list of ship launches in 1985 includes a chronological list of all ships launched in 1985.


References

1985
Ship launches